Beatrice is an 1890 novel by the British writer H. Rider Haggard. The author later called it "one of the best bits of work I ever did."

Reception

Adaptation
The book was adapted into a 1921 film called The Stronger Passion.

References

External links
Complete novel at Project Gutenberg
 
Images and bibliographic information for various editions of Beatrice at SouthAfricaBooks.com

Novels by H. Rider Haggard
1890 British novels
British novels adapted into films